The following outline is provided as an overview of and topical guide to music:

Music – human expression often in the medium of time using the structures of sounds or tones and silence. It may be expressed in terms of pitch, rhythm, harmony, and timbre.

Definition of music 
 Definition of music
 One of the arts –
 One of the performing arts –
 One of the humanities –
 An academic discipline –

History of music 

History of music
 Timeline of musical events –
 Prehistoric music
 Ancient music
 Music in ancient India
 Music of Mesopotamia
 Music of ancient Greece
 Music of ancient Rome

 Art music
 Andalusian classical music
 Arab classical music
 Chinese classical music
 Indian classical music
 Carnatic music
 Hindustani classical music
 Persian traditional music
 Sasanian music

 Western classical music
 Dates of classical music eras
 Early music period
 European medieval music
 Saint Gall
 Saint Martial
 Goliard
 Ars antiqua
 Notre-Dame school
 Troubadour
 Trouvère
 Minnesang
 Ars nova
 Trecento
 Ars subtilior
 Renaissance music
 Common practice period
 Baroque music
 the galant music period
 Classical period
 Romantic music
 20th-century classical music 
 Impressionism
 Expressionist
 Modernism 
 Neoclassicism
 Experimental music
 Postmodern music
 Contemporary classical music
 21st-century classical music

By region or ethnicity 

 Timeline of trends in Australian music
 Byzantine music
 Timeline of Chinese music
 Timeline of trends in Italian music
 Timeline of music in the United States
 History of music in the biblical period

Musical ensembles 

Musical ensemble   

 Band –
 Band (rock and pop) –
 Brass band –
 Concert band –
 Fanfare band –
 Jazz band –
Big band –
 Marching band –
 Military band –
Ottoman military band –
 One-man band – 
 Pipe band –
 Camerata –
 Chapel –
 Choir –
 Flute choir –
 Men's chorus –
 Singakademie –
 Decet –
 Duet –
 Piano duet –
 Duodecet –
 Gamelan –
 Nonet –
 Octet –
 String octet –
 Orchestra –
 Pit orchestra –
 String orchestra –
 Percussion ensemble –
 Quartet –
 Flute quartet –
 Piano quartet –
 Saxophone quartet –
 String quartet – 
 Wind quartet –
 Woodwind quartet –
 Quintet –
 Brass quintet –
 Clarinet quintet –
 Pierrot ensemble –
 String quintet –
 Wind quintet –
 Septet –
 Sextet –
 Piano sextet –
 String sextet –
 Sinfonietta –
 Trio –
 Clarinet trio –
 Jazz trio –
Organ trio –
 Piano trio –
 String trio –

Genres of music 

Music genre   (list)

 Blues –
 Classical –
 Country –
 Electronic –
Electronic dance –
 Electronica –
 Folk –
 Funk –
 Gospel –
 Grunge –
 Hip hop –
 Jazz –
Avant-garde jazz –
Chamber jazz –
Free jazz –
Latin jazz –
Orchestral jazz –
 Latin –
Latin ballad –
 Martial music
 Pop –
Dance-pop –
Electropop –
 Reggae –
 Rhythm and blues –
 Rock –
Heavy metal –
Progressive rock –
Psychedelic rock –
Punk rock –
 Ska –
 Theatre music –
 Ballet –
 Opera –
 Musical theatre –
 Incidental music –

Music by region 

Cultural and regional genres of music

 Africa

 West Africa 

 Benin • Burkina Faso • Cape Verde • Côte d'Ivoire • Gambia • Ghana • Guinea • Guinea-Bissau • Liberia • Mali • Mauritania • Niger • Nigeria • Senegal • Sierra Leone • Togo

 North Africa 

 Algeria • Egypt • Libya • Mauritania • Morocco • Sudan • South Sudan •Tunisia • Western Sahara

 Central Africa 

 Angola • Burundi • Cameroon • Central African Republic • Chad • The Democratic Republic of the Congo • Equatorial Guinea • Gabon • Republic of the Congo • Rwanda • São Tomé and Príncipe

 East Africa 

 Burundi • Comoros • Djibouti • Eritrea • Ethiopia • Kenya • Madagascar • Malawi • Mauritius • Mozambique • Rwanda • Seychelles • Somalia • Tanzania • Uganda • Zambia • Zimbabwe

 Southern Africa  

 Botswana • Lesotho • Namibia • South Africa • Eswatini

 Dependencies
 
 Mayotte (France)  • St. Helena (UK) • Puntland • Somaliland  • Sahrawi Arab Democratic Republic

 Asia
 Central Asia
 Kazakhstan •  Kyrgyzstan •  Tajikistan •  Turkmenistan •  Uzbekistan
 East Asia
China • Tibet • Hong Kong •  Macau • Japan •  North Korea •  South Korea •  Mongolia •  Taiwan
 North Asia
 Russia
 Southeast Asia
 Brunei •  Burma (Myanmar)  •  Cambodia •  East Timor (Timor-Leste) •  Indonesia •  Laos •  Malaysia •  Philippines (Metro Manila) •  Singapore •  Thailand (Bangkok) •  Vietnam
 South Asia
 Afghanistan •  Bangladesh •  Bhutan •  Maldives •  Nepal •  Pakistan •  Sri Lanka
 India
 States of India: Andhra Pradesh • Arunachal Pradesh • Assam • Bihar • Chhattisgarh • Goa • Gujarat • Haryana • Himachal Pradesh • Jammu and Kashmir • Jharkhand • Karnataka • Kerala • Madhya Pradesh • Maharashtra • Manipur • Meghalaya • Mizoram • Nagaland • Odisha • Punjab • Rajasthan • Sikkim • Tamil Nadu • Telangana • Tripura • Uttar Pradesh • Uttarakhand • West Bengal
 West Asia
  Armenia •  Azerbaijan •  Bahrain •  Cyprus (including disputed Northern Cyprus) •  Georgia • Iran • Iraq •  Israel •  Jordan •  Kuwait •  Lebanon •  Oman •  State of Palestine • Qatar •  Saudi Arabia •  Syria •  Turkey •  United Arab Emirates •  Yemen

 Caucasus (a region considered to be in both Asia and Europe, or between them)

 North Caucasus
 Parts of Russia (Chechnya, Ingushetia, Dagestan, Adyghea, Kabardino-Balkaria, Karachai-Cherkessia, North Ossetia, Krasnodar Krai, Stavropol Krai)

 South Caucasus
 Georgia (including disputed Abkhazia, South Ossetia) • Armenia •   Azerbaijan (including disputed Nagorno-Karabakh Republic)

 Europe 
 Akrotiri and Dhekelia • Åland • Albania • Andorra • Armenia • Austria • Azerbaijan • Belarus • Belgium • Bosnia and Herzegovina • Bulgaria • Croatia • Cyprus • Czech Republic • Denmark • Estonia • Faroe Islands • Finland • France • Georgia • Germany • Gibraltar • Greece • Guernsey • Hungary • Iceland • Ireland • Isle of Man • Italy (Rome) • Jersey • Kazakhstan • Kosovo • Latvia • Liechtenstein • Lithuania • Luxembourg • Macedonia • Malta • Moldova (including disputed Transnistria) • Monaco • Montenegro • Netherlands • Poland • Portugal • Romania • Russia • San Marino • Serbia • Slovakia • Slovenia •
 Norway
 Svalbard  
Spain
 Autonomous communities of Spain: Catalonia
 Sweden • Switzerland • Turkey • Ukraine 
 United Kingdom
 England (Cornwall, London, Sussex) • Northern Ireland • Scotland • Wales (Cardiff, Newport)
 Vatican City

 European Union

 North America
 Canada  
 Provinces of Canada:  • Alberta  • British Columbia (Vancouver) • Manitoba  • New Brunswick  • Newfoundland and Labrador  • Nova Scotia  • Ontario • Prince Edward Island  • Quebec • Saskatchewan
 Territories of Canada: Northwest Territories • Nunavut  • Yukon

Greenland • Saint Pierre and Miquelon

 United States 

 Alabama • Alaska • Arizona (Tucson) • Arkansas • California (Los Angeles)  • Colorado Denver • Connecticut • Delaware • Florida • Georgia (Athens, Atlanta)  • Hawaii • Idaho • Illinois (Chicago) • Indiana • Iowa • Kansas • Kentucky • Louisiana • Maine • Maryland (Annapolis, Baltimore)  • Massachusetts • Michigan (Detroit)  • Minnesota • Mississippi • Missouri • Montana • Nebraska • Nevada • New Hampshire • New Jersey • New Mexico • New York (New York City)  • North Carolina • North Dakota • Ohio • Oklahoma • Oregon • Pennsylvania (Philadelphia) • Rhode Island • South Carolina • South Dakota • Tennessee • Texas Austin • Utah • Vermont • Virginia • Washington (Olympia, Seattle)  • West Virginia • Wisconsin • Wyoming

 Washington, D.C.

 Mexico 

 Central America
 Belize • Costa Rica • El Salvador • Guatemala • Honduras • Nicaragua • Panama

 Caribbean
 Anguilla • Antigua and Barbuda •  Aruba •  Bahamas •  Barbados •  Bermuda •  British Virgin Islands •  Cayman Islands •  Cuba •  Dominica •  Dominican Republic •  Grenada •  Haiti •  Jamaica •  Montserrat •  Netherlands Antilles •  Puerto Rico •  Saint Barthélemy •  Saint Kitts and Nevis •  Saint Lucia •  Saint Martin •  Saint Vincent and the Grenadines •  Trinidad and Tobago •  Turks and Caicos Islands •  United States Virgin Islands

Oceania (includes the continent of Australia)
 Australasia
 Australia  
 (Adelaide, Perth, Sydney)
 Dependencies/Territories of Australia
 Christmas Island •  Cocos (Keeling) Islands •   Norfolk Island
 New Zealand  
 Melanesia
 Fiji •  Indonesia (Oceanian part only) •  New Caledonia (France) •  Papua New Guinea •  Solomon Islands •  Vanuatu •  
 Micronesia
 Federated States of Micronesia •  Guam (USA) •  Kiribati •  Marshall Islands •  Nauru •  Northern Mariana Islands (USA) •  Palau •  Wake Island (USA) •  
 Polynesia
 American Samoa (USA) •  Chatham Islands (NZ) •  Cook Islands (NZ) •  Easter Island (Chile) •  French Polynesia (France)  •  Hawaii (USA) •  Loyalty Islands (France) • Niue (NZ) •  Pitcairn Islands (UK) •  Adamstown •  Samoa •  Tokelau (NZ) •  Tonga •  Tuvalu •  Wallis and Futuna (France)

 South America 
 Argentina • Bolivia • Brazil • Chile • Colombia • Ecuador • Falkland Islands • Guyana • Paraguay • Peru • Suriname • Uruguay • Venezuela

 South Atlantic

 Ascension Island •  Saint Helena • Tristan da Cunha

Musical compositions 

Musical composition

Types of musical pieces and compositions 

Musical form

Single-movement forms

  Strophic form (AA...) –
 Binary form (AB) –
 Ternary form less often tertiary (ABA) –
 Arch form (ABCBA)

Multi-movement forms

 Ballet –
 Cantata –
 Chorale –
 Concerto –
 Dance –
 Etude –
 Fantasia –
 Fugue –
 Mass –
 Opera –
 Oratorio –
 Prelude –
 Requiem –
 Rhapsody –
 Sonata –
 Suite –
 Symphonic poem –
 Symphony –

Sections of a piece or composition 

Section (music)
 Introduction –
 Exposition –
 Recapitulation –
 Verse –
 Refrain (chorus) –
 Bridge –
 Interlude –
 Guitar solo –
 Conclusion –
 Coda –
 Fadeout

Musical notation 

Musical notation – 
 Staff –
 Clefs –
 Key signature –
 Key –
 Time signature –
 Beats –
 Bars (Measures) –
 Ledger lines –
 Grand staff –
 Notes –
 Note values –
 Dotted notes –
 Ties –
 Accidentals –
 Tempo –
 Dynamics –
 Lyrics (included on vocal music) –
 Modern musical symbols
 Score (for ensembles) –
 Sheet music

Variations of musical notation 

 Percussion notation –
 Figured bass –
 Lead sheets –
 Chord charts –
 Shape note system –

Musical techniques 

 Bell chord
 Broken chords
 Arpeggio
 Bass arpeggiation
 Non-harmonic arpeggio
 Ostinato
 Tremolo
 Guitar performance techniques

Musical skills and procedures 

 Absolute pitch –
 Ear training –
 Fingering –
 Learning music by ear –
 Modulation –
 Numerical sight-singing –
 Practice –
 Relative pitch –
 Sight reading –
 "Swinging" –
 Transposition –
 Tuning –
 Virtuosity –

Vocal ranges 

 Vocal range –

Female ranges 

 Soprano –
 Mezzo-soprano –
 Contralto –

Male ranges

 Boy soprano –

 Sopranist –
 Alto –
 Tenor –
 Baritone –
 Bass-baritone –
 Bass –

Musical instruments 

Musical instrument   (List of musical instruments)
 Wind instruments –
 Percussion instruments –
 String instruments –
 Voice –
 Electronic instruments –
 Keyboard instruments –
 Musical keyboard –
See also the List of musical instruments by Hornbostel–Sachs number

Music technology 

Music technology –
 Electric music technology
 Electronic and digital music technology
 Mechanical music technology

Music industry 

Music industry
 Album –
 Compact disc (CD) –
 Compact Cassette –
 Concert –
 Concert tour –
 Grammy Awards –
 Music recording sales certification –
 Performance –
 Record –
 Record industry –
 Recording studio –
 Single –

Music industry participants 

 A&R –
 ASCAP –
 Band manager –
 Booking agent –
 BMI –
 Copyright collective –
 Disc jockey –
 MCPS –
 Musician – person who writes, performs, or makes music. Musicians can be classified by their roles in creating or performing music.
 Instrumentalist – one who plays a musical instrument.
 Traditional instrumentalist – one who plays folk music on traditional instruments such as gongs.
 Classical instrumentalist – one who plays classical music, usually with Western orchestral instruments such as the violin, flute etc. 
 Instrumentalists who plays popular music – one who plays with instruments in the big band, e.g. the electric guitar, drums, saxophone, trumpet, trombone etc.
 Singer – a vocalist.
 Composer – person who creates music, either by musical notation or oral tradition, for interpretation and performance, or through direct manipulation of sonic material through electronic media.
 Songwriter –
 Arranger –
 Conductor – leads a musical ensemble. A conductor may simultaneously act as an instrumentalist in the ensemble.
 Recording artist – creates recorded music, such as CDs and MP3 files.
 Musicians' Union –
 Publisher –
 PRS –
 Record producer –
 Record label –
 Record distributor –
 Tour promoter –
 Road crew ("roadies") –
 Performance rights organisation –

Music theory 

Music theory

Elements of music 

Elements of music – 
 Pitch – 
 Scale – 
 Mode – 
 Chord – 
 Dynamics (music) – 
 Articulation – 
 Texture – 
 Consonance and dissonance – 
 Expression – 
 Harmony – 
 Melody – 
 Musical form – 
 Notation – 
 Rhythm – 
 Timbre –

Musicology 

Musicology –
 Biomusicology –
 Evolutionary musicology –
 Cognitive musicology – 
 Ethnomusicology – 
 Historical musicology – 
 Systematic musicology – 
 Sociomusicology (music sociology) – 
 Philosophy of music – 
 Music acoustics (physics of music) – 
 Computer sciences of music
 Sound and music computing – 
 Music information retrieval – 
 Computing in musicology – 
 Zoomusicology –

Music education 

Music education –
 Music lessons –

Music and politics 

Music and politics –

Music organizations 
 Musicians' Union (UK)
 Sony Music Entertainment
 International Music Council
 International Federation of the Phonographic Industry
 Australian Recording Industry Association

Music publications

Psychology of music 
Psychology of music
 Cognitive musicology
 Cognitive neuroscience of music
 Culture in music cognition
 Music and emotion
 Music-specific disorders
 Music therapy
 Psychoacoustics
 Psychoanalysis and music
 Psychology of music preference

See also 

 Index of music articles
 Glossary of musical terminology
 List of music software

External links 

 Taxonomy of musical instruments
 The Virginia Tech Multimedia Music Dictionary, with definitions, pronunciations, examples, quizzes and simulations
 The Music-Web Music Encyclopedia, for musicians, composers and music lovers
 Dolmetsch free online music dictionary, complete, with references to a list of specialised music dictionaries (by continent, by instrument, by genre, etc.)
 Musico-Dico, a little music encyclopedia.
"On Hermeneutical Ethics and Education: Bach als Erzieher", a paper by Prof. Miguel Ángel Quintana Paz in which he explains the history of the different views hold about music in Western societies, since the Ancient Greece to our days.
 BBC Blast Music For 13- to 19-year-olds interested in learning about, making, performing and talking about music.
 Musical Terms - Glossary of music terms from Naxos
 Monthly Online Features From Bloomingdale School of Music, addressing a variety of musical topics for a wide audience
 Arts and Music Uplifting Society towards Transformation and Tolerance Articles meant to stimulate people's awareness about the peace enhancing, transforming,
 PhilosophyOfMusic.org edited by Dustin Garlitz
 Experimental Early Music

 
 
Music
Music